Ndoulo Arrondissement is an arrondissement of the Diourbel Department in the Diourbel Region of Senegal.

Subdivisions
The arrondissement is divided administratively into rural communities and in turn into villages.

Arrondissements of Senegal
Diourbel Region